Kona Macphee is a British poet. She has published three poetry collections, Tails, Perfect Blue and What Long Miles. She is the recipient of the Eric Gregory Award, the Geoffrey Faber Memorial Prize and was named the poetry book of the month for July 2013 by  The Observer.

Biography
Kona Macphee was born in London in 1969. She grew up in Melbourne, Australia. She attended the Sydney Conservatorium of Music, studying musical composition. She also studied violin at the University of Sydney, and computer science at Monash University, She later earned an M.Sc. at Cambridge University as a Commonwealth Scholar.

She was awarded a year-long  fellowship to the University of Stirling in 2012.  She has worked in a variety of jobs, including web editor and developer, motorcycle mechanic and media producer.

Macphee's first poetry collection, Tails was published in 2004 by Bloodaxe Books. Her second collection, Perfect Blue (Bloodaxe Books) was published  in 2010. Perfect Blue was the recipient of the Geoffrey Faber Memorial Prize in 2010. Her third poetry collection, What Long Miles  (Bloodaxe Books), published in 2013, was named  The Observer'''s poetry book of the month for July 2013.

Macphee has taught poetry classes for various organizations including the Poetry Society, the Poetry School, the Arvon Foundation, and the Scottish Poetry Library.
She currently lives in Perthshire and works in media production.

Poetry collectionsTails, Bloodaxe Books, (2004)Perfect Blue, Bloodaxe Books, (2010)What Long Miles'', Bloodaxe Books, (2013)

Awards
 (1998) Eric Gregory Award
 (2010) Geoffrey Faber Memorial Prize

References

1969 births
Living people
Sydney Conservatorium of Music alumni
Alumni of the University of Cambridge
21st-century British women writers
21st-century British poets
People from Perthshire